Fryerning Mill (or Mill Green Mill) is a grade II* listed post mill at Mill Green, Fryerning, Essex, which has been restored.

History

The mill was built by Robert Barker, a millwright from Chelmsford. A roundhouse was included from the start. The mill was owned by the Petre estate and records of expenditure on the mill are in the Essex Record Office.

In July or August 1774, a farmer was killed by being struck by the sails of the mill. New sails were fitted in 1802 and 1806, and a new stock in 1821. An accident at the mill resulted in the miller sustaining a fractured thigh in 1852, and the owner of the mill being reported to have been carried round on the sails for ten or twelve revolutions before he was rescued. The roof of the mill was repaired in 1878 and the mill re-tarred. A new sail was fitted in 1884 and a new pair of sails in 1902. The mill was working until at least 1905.

Some repairs were done to the body of the mill in the 1930s. The mill was restored in 1959 by R.F. Collinson, who had bought the mill house and discovered the mill in the garden. This entailed the complete replacement of the frame of the mill, including the crowntree. On 2 January 1976, the sails ran away in a gale and the brake wheel disintegrated. A new brake wheel was constructed in 1989.

Description

Mill Green Mill is a post mill with a single-storey roundhouse. The mill is winded by a tailpole. It has two spring sails and two spring patents. There are two pairs of millstones arranged head and tail.

Trestle and roundhouse

The trestle is of oak, with the main post thought to be of sweet chestnut. The roundhouse is of brick, with a boarded roof covered in tarred felt.

Body

It has a cast-iron plate bolted to its underside, with a pintle projecting downwards that fits into a cast-iron pot on the top of the main post, a reversal of the normal fitting.

Sails and windshaft

As originally built, the mill would have had a wooden windshaft and four common sails. The windshaft is of cast iron, probably replacing a former wooden one. The mill has two spring sails and two spring patents.

Machinery

The head wheel is of clasp arm construction, it is  diameter. It has an iron segment ring bolted on which has a total of 120 teeth. It drive a cast-iron stone nut, with 20 cogs. Originally, the head wheel had 69 cogs, of 4½ in (114 mm) pitch. The tail wheel is also of clasp arm construction,  diameter. It has an iron segment ring bolted on which has a total of one hundred teeth. It drives a cast-iron stone nut, with fifteen cogs. Both wheels were made from elm. The headstones are  diameter and the tailstones are  diameter.

Millers

Millers who worked this mill were:
Dearman 1759–?
John Dearman ?–1852
Alfred Tuck 1855–66
James Nicholls 1866–99
Rankin 1899–1905

External links
Windmill World webpage on Mill Green Mill.

References

Post mills in the United Kingdom
Grinding mills in the United Kingdom
Windmills completed in 1759
Grade II* listed buildings in Essex
Windmills in Essex
Buildings and structures in the Borough of Brentwood
Grade II* listed windmills